The Church of Saint George is one of eleven rock-hewn monolithic churches in Lalibela, a town in the Amhara Region of Ethiopia. Originally named Roha (Warwar), the historical and religious site was named Lalibela after the King Gebre Mesqel Lalibela of the Zagwe dynasty, who commissioned its construction. He is regarded as a saint by the Ethiopian Orthodox Tewahedo Church.

History

The Church of Saint George was carved downwards from a type of volcanic tuff. This is the sole architectural material that was used in the structure. It has been dated to the late 12th or early 13th century AD, and thought to have been constructed during the reign of King Gebre Mesqel Lalibela, of the late Zagwe dynasty. It is among the best known and last built of the eleven churches in the Lalibela area, and has been referred to as the "Eighth Wonder of the World". Lalibela, King of Ethiopia, sought to recreate Jerusalem, and structured the churches' landscape and religious sites in such a way as to achieve such a feat. “The churches at Lalibela are clustered in two major groups, one representing the earthly Jerusalem, and the other representing the heavenly Jerusalem. Located directly between them is a trench representing the River Jordan”.  The dimensions of the trench are 25 meters by 25 meters by 30 meters, and there is a small baptismal pool outside the church, which stands in an artificial trench.

According to Ethiopian cultural history, Bete Giyorgis was built after King Gebre Mesqel Lalibela of the Zagwe dynasty had a vision in which he was instructed to construct the church; Saint George and God have both been referred to as the one who gave him the instructions.

Lalibela is a pilgrimage site for members of the Ethiopian Orthodox Tewahedo Church; the church itself is part of the UNESCO World Heritage Site "Rock-Hewn Churches, Lalibela".

On first approach the site appears wholly inaccessible, with sheer drops on every side and no access bridge. It is accessed via a very narrow man-made canyon, spiralling downwards, which changes to a tunnel close to the church, to further conceal its presence.

Pilgrims who died after reaching the site are placed in a simple open tomb on the outer walls.

The hollowed interior contains a simple shrine to St. George and, behind a curtain (forbidden to view apart from priests) lies a replica of the Ark of the Covenant.

Bete Giyorgis was spatially documented in 2005.

See also 
 List of colossal sculpture in situ
 Saint George: Devotions, traditions and prayers

References

External links

 Fine Art Photos from the Church
 Gallery of photos of the church's interior and exterior
 Info on the church of Lalibela
 A 3D representation of the church of Lalibela

Oriental Orthodox congregations established in the 13th century
Rock-Hewn Churches, Lalibela